Zygaena kavrigini is a species of moth in the Zygaenidae family. It is found in Central Asia. Seitz states Z. kavrigini Gr.-Grsh. (7 g) has the abdomen mostly entirely red, inclusive of base; from Kuchara. The larva feeds on Alhagi canescens

References

Moths described in 1887
Zygaena
Moths of Asia